The 1980 AIAW National Division III Basketball Championship was the inaugural tournament hosted by the Association for Intercollegiate Athletics for Women to determine the national champion of collegiate basketball among its Division III members in the United States.

The tournament was held in Spokane, Washington.

Worcester State defeated Wisconsin–La Crosse in the championship game, 76–73, to capture the Lancers' first AIAW Division III national title.

Format
Twenty-four teams participated in a single-elimination tournament, with eight teams receiving byes into the second round. 

The tournament also included a third-place game for the two teams that lost in the semifinal games.

Tournament bracket

See also
1980 AIAW National Division I Basketball Championship
1980 AIAW National Division II Basketball Championship

References

AIAW women's basketball tournament
AIAW Division III
AIAW National Division III Basketball Championship
1980 in sports in Washington (state)
Women's sports in Washington (state)